Perfectamundo is the debut studio album by American rock musician Billy Gibbons and rock band The BFG's. The album was released on November 6, 2015, by Concord Records.

Critical reception

Perfectamundo received generally positive reviews from music critics. At Metacritic, which assigns a normalized rating out of 100 to reviews from mainstream critics, the album received an average score of 67 based on 11 reviews, which indicates "generally positive reviews".

Track listing

Personnel
Billy Gibbons: Vocals, Guitar, Bass guitar, Hammond B3, Piano, Composer, Design, Producer
Mike Flanigin: Hammond B3, Composer
Alx "Guitarzza" Garza: Guitar (Bass)
Martin Guigui: Hammond B3, Piano, Producer
Joe Hardy: Guitar, Guitar (Bass), Keyboards, Vocals, Mastering, Mixing, Producer
G.L. Moon: Guitar, Composer, Engineer
Greg Morrow: Drums, Engineer
Nick Jay: Audio Engineer, "Q-Vo"

References

2015 debut albums
Concord Records albums